Franklin Stuart Van Antwerpen (October 23, 1941 – July 25, 2016) was a United States circuit judge of the United States Court of Appeals for the Third Circuit. He assumed senior status on October 23, 2006, on his 65th birthday, serving in that status until his death.

Early life and education 

Born in Passaic, New Jersey, he attended Newark Academy, graduating in 1960. Van Antwerpen studied at the University of Maine, receiving a Bachelor of Science degree. He earned a Juris Doctor at the Temple University Beasley School of Law.

Professional career 

Van Antwerpen was contracts counsel for the Hazeltine Corporation in New York City from 1967 to 1970. He was chief counsel for the Northampton County Legal Aid Society in Easton, Pennsylvania from 1970 to 1971. He was in private practice of law in Easton from 1971 to 1979. He was a judge of the Northampton County Court of Common Pleas in Easton from 1979 to 1987.

Federal judicial service

Van Antwerpen was nominated by President Ronald Reagan on September 11, 1987, to a seat on the United States District Court for the Eastern District of Pennsylvania vacated by Judge Alfred Leopold Luongo. He was confirmed by the United States Senate on December 8, 1987, and received his commission on December 9, 1987. His service was terminated on June 1, 2004, due to elevation to the Third Circuit. He was succeeded by Judge Thomas M. Golden.

On September 11, 1991, President George H. W. Bush nominated Van Antwerpen to the United States Court of Appeals for the Third Circuit. However, Van Antwerpen's nomination languished in the Senate Judiciary Committee, and it expired with the end of Bush's presidency. President Bill Clinton chose not to renominate Van Antwerpen to the Third Circuit.

Van Antwerpen was nominated by President George W. Bush on November 21, 2003, to a seat on the United States Court of Appeals for the Third Circuit vacated by Judge Edward R. Becker. He was confirmed by the Senate on May 20, 2004 by a 96–0 vote. He received his commission on May 24, 2004. "It's happened. We did it. And wow!" Van Antwerpen told a local newspaper after his confirmation vote. He assumed senior status on October 23, 2006, serving in that status until his death on July 25, 2016, in Palmer Township, Northampton County, Pennsylvania. His seat on the Third Circuit was filled by Judge Thomas I. Vanaskie in 2010.

See also

George H.W. Bush judicial appointment controversies

References

External links

U.S. Justice Department Profile

1941 births
2016 deaths
Judges of the United States Court of Appeals for the Third Circuit
Judges of the United States District Court for the Eastern District of Pennsylvania
Newark Academy alumni
People from Passaic, New Jersey
Pennsylvania lawyers
Judges of the Pennsylvania Courts of Common Pleas
Temple University Beasley School of Law alumni
United States court of appeals judges appointed by George W. Bush
21st-century American judges
United States district court judges appointed by Ronald Reagan
20th-century American judges
University of Maine alumni